COMEX (or Compagnie Maritime d'Expertises) is a French company specializing in engineering and deep diving operations, created in November 1961 by Henri-Germain Delauze and ran by him until his death in 2012.

This company is known worldwide for its technology in regard to underwater exploration at great depths.

Its line of business includes:
 hyperbaric testing facilities,
 oceanographic research ships (Minibex and Janus),
 testing pool.

COMEX carried out pioneering work in very deep saturation diving. The company experimented with the use of hydrogen in the divers' breathing gas. 

This work with heliox (a breathing gas mixture of helium and oxygen) and hydreliox (an exotic breathing gas mixture of helium, oxygen and hydrogen gas) mixtures started with Hydra I in 1968.

The use of hydrogen for diving was in part driven by the need to overcome the problems of high-pressure nervous syndrome (HPNS). However, there was another reason for the interest in using hydrogen in a breathing gas. In 1987, Comex was part of a Canadian-French consortium that was building the world’s first commercial nuclear mini-submarine. This submarine, Saga, was a prototype intended to be used for oil exploration and development under the Arctic ice. Saga was built on a hull originally constructed by Jacques-Yves Cousteau but not completed due to lack of funds. Saga would have a complete saturation diving system on board. The nuclear power plant would be able to produce large volumes of hydrogen and oxygen through the electrolysis of water. This would provide plentiful amounts of breathing gas for autonomous diving operations under the Arctic ice cap.

The project suffered tax problems in Canada which caused political repercussions between the French and Canadian governments. Saga did undergo successful sea trials in 1991 but without the intended nuclear power plant. Underwater propulsion was provided by a Stirling engine and surface propulsion by a diesel engine. The project was abandoned and Saga was laid up at Marseille.

References

External links
 Official COMEX Website
 Historique Henri-Germain Delauze

Diving engineering
Manufacturing companies based in Marseille
Commercial diving contractors